Clarence is a railway station on the Blue Mountains section of the Main Western railway line in New South Wales, Australia. It opened in 1874 on the original alignment from Bell to the Clarence Tunnel. With the opening of Dargan's Deviation, it was rebuilt to its second location.

When the Ten Tunnels Deviation was completed in 1910, the (third) station was rebuilt on the new line (adjacent to the Chifley Road bridge) but was closed in 1974. Little trace of this third station now remains.

The second station site has been re-used by the Zig Zag Railway for its upper passenger connection point and car park.

Sites
 Current - 
 10 Tunnels -

References

Disused regional railway stations in New South Wales
Railway stations in Australia opened in 1874
Railway stations closed in 1910
Railway stations in Australia opened in 1910
Railway stations closed in 1974
Main Western railway line, New South Wales